Center Parkway station is a side platformed Sacramento RT light rail station in Sacramento, California, United States. The station was opened on August 24, 2015, and is operated by the Sacramento Regional Transit District. It is served by the Blue Line. The station is located on the north side of Cosumnes River Boulevard at Center Parkway, serving the Valley Hi neighborhood and Valley High School in South Sacramento. There is no park and ride lot at the Center Parkway station.

References 

Sacramento Regional Transit light rail stations
Railway stations in the United States opened in 2015